Tyrannosaurus is a genus of large theropod dinosaur. The species Tyrannosaurus rex (rex meaning "king" in Latin), often called T. rex or colloquially T-Rex, is one of the best represented theropods. It lived throughout what is now western North America, on what was then an island continent known as Laramidia. Tyrannosaurus had a much wider range than other tyrannosaurids. Fossils are found in a variety of rock formations dating to the Maastrichtian age of the Upper Cretaceous period, 68 to 66 million years ago. It was the last known member of the tyrannosaurids and among the last non-avian dinosaurs to exist before the Cretaceous–Paleogene extinction event.

Like other tyrannosaurids, Tyrannosaurus was a bipedal carnivore with a massive skull balanced by a long, heavy tail. Relative to its large and powerful hind limbs, the forelimbs of Tyrannosaurus were short but unusually powerful for their size, and they had two clawed digits. Although other theropods rivaled or exceeded Tyrannosaurus rex in size, it is still among the largest known land predators and is estimated to have exerted the strongest bite force among all terrestrial animals. By far the largest carnivore in its environment, Tyrannosaurus rex was most likely an apex predator, preying upon hadrosaurs, juvenile armored herbivores like ceratopsians and ankylosaurs, and possibly sauropods. Some experts have suggested the dinosaur was primarily a scavenger. The question of whether Tyrannosaurus was an apex predator or a pure scavenger was among the longest debates in paleontology. Most paleontologists today accept that Tyrannosaurus was both an active predator and a scavenger.

Specimens of Tyrannosaurus rex include some that are nearly complete skeletons. Soft tissue and proteins have been reported in at least one of these specimens. The abundance of fossil material has allowed significant research into many aspects of its biology, including its life history and biomechanics. The feeding habits, physiology, and potential speed of Tyrannosaurus rex are a few subjects of debate. Its taxonomy is also controversial, as some scientists consider Tarbosaurus bataar from Asia to be a second Tyrannosaurus species, while others maintain Tarbosaurus is a separate genus. Several other genera of North American tyrannosaurids have also been synonymized with Tyrannosaurus.

As the archetypal theropod, Tyrannosaurus has been one of the best-known dinosaurs since the early 20th century and has been featured in film, advertising, postal stamps, and many other media.

History of research

Earliest finds

Teeth from what is now documented as a Tyrannosaurus rex were found in 1874 by Arthur Lakes near Golden, Colorado. In the early 1890s, John Bell Hatcher collected postcranial elements in eastern Wyoming. The fossils were believed to be from the large species Ornithomimus grandis (now Deinodon) but are now considered T. rex remains.

In 1892, Edward Drinker Cope found two vertebral fragments of a large dinosaur. Cope believed the fragments belonged to an "agathaumid" (ceratopsid) dinosaur, and named them Manospondylus gigas, meaning "giant porous vertebra", in reference to the numerous openings for blood vessels he found in the bone. The M. gigas remains were, in 1907, identified by Hatcher as those of a theropod rather than a ceratopsid.

Henry Fairfield Osborn recognized the similarity between Manospondylus gigas and T. rex as early as 1917, by which time the second vertebra had been lost. Owing to the fragmentary nature of the Manospondylus vertebrae, Osborn did not synonymize the two genera, instead considering the older genus indeterminate. In June 2000, the Black Hills Institute found around 10% of a Tyrannosaurus skeleton (BHI 6248) at a site that might have been the original M. gigas locality.

Skeleton discovery and naming

Barnum Brown, assistant curator of the American Museum of Natural History, found the first partial skeleton of T. rex in eastern Wyoming in 1900. Brown found another partial skeleton in the Hell Creek Formation in Montana in 1902, comprising approximately 34 fossilized bones. Writing at the time Brown said "Quarry No. 1 contains the femur, pubes, humerus, three vertebrae and two undetermined bones of a large Carnivorous Dinosaur not described by Marsh. ... I have never seen anything like it from the Cretaceous". Henry Fairfield Osborn, president of the American Museum of Natural History, named the second skeleton T. rex in 1905. Osborn used the Latin word , meaning "king", for the specific name. The full binomial therefore translates to "tyrant lizard the king" or "King Tyrant Lizard", emphasizing the animal's size and perceived dominance over other species of the time.

Osborn named the other specimen Dynamosaurus imperiosus in a paper in 1905. In 1906, Osborn recognized that the two skeletons were from the same species and selected Tyrannosaurus as the preferred name. The original Dynamosaurus material resides in the collections of the Natural History Museum, London. In 1941, the T. rex type specimen was sold to the Carnegie Museum of Natural History in Pittsburgh, Pennsylvania, for $7,000. Dynamosaurus would later be honored by the 2018 description of another species of tyrannosaurid by Andrew McDonald and colleagues, Dynamoterror dynastes, whose name was chosen in reference to the 1905 name, as it had been a "childhood favorite" of McDonald's.

From the 1910s through the end of the 1950s, Barnum's discoveries remained the only specimens of Tyrannosaurus, as the Great Depression and wars kept many paleontologists out of the field.

Resurgent interest

Beginning in the 1960s, there was renewed interest in Tyrannosaurus, resulting in the recovery of 42 skeletons (5–80% complete by bone count) from Western North America. In 1967, Dr. William MacMannis located and recovered the skeleton named "MOR 008", which is 15% complete by bone count and has a reconstructed skull displayed at the Museum of the Rockies. The 1990s saw numerous discoveries, with nearly twice as many finds as in all previous years, including two of the most complete skeletons found to date: Sue and Stan.

Sue Hendrickson, an amateur paleontologist, discovered the most complete (approximately 85%) and largest Tyrannosaurus skeleton in the Hell Creek Formation on August 12, 1990. The specimen Sue, named after the discoverer, was the object of a legal battle over its ownership. In 1997, the litigation was settled in favor of Maurice Williams, the original land owner. The fossil collection was purchased by the Field Museum of Natural History at auction for $7.6 million, making it the most expensive dinosaur skeleton until the sale of Stan for $31.8 million in 2020. From 1998 to 1999, Field Museum of Natural History staff spent over 25,000 hours taking the rock off the bones. The bones were then shipped to New Jersey where the mount was constructed, then shipped back to Chicago for the final assembly. The mounted skeleton opened to the public on May 17, 2000, in the Field Museum of Natural History. A study of this specimen's fossilized bones showed that Sue reached full size at age 19 and died at the age of 28, the longest estimated life of any tyrannosaur known. 

Another Tyrannosaurus, nicknamed Stan (BHI 3033), in honor of amateur paleontologist Stan Sacrison, was recovered from the Hell Creek Formation in 1992. Stan is the second most complete skeleton found, with 199 bones recovered representing 70% of the total. This tyrannosaur also had many bone pathologies, including broken and healed ribs, a broken (and healed) neck, and a substantial hole in the back of its head, about the size of a Tyrannosaurus tooth.

In 1998, Bucky Derflinger noticed a T. rex toe exposed above ground, making Derflinger, who was 20 years old at the time, the youngest person to discover a Tyrannosaurus. Bucky is the first Tyrannosaurus to be found that preserved a furcula (wishbone). Bucky is permanently displayed at The Children's Museum of Indianapolis.

In the summer of 2000, crews organized by Jack Horner discovered five Tyrannosaurus skeletons near the Fort Peck Reservoir. In 2001, a 50% complete skeleton of a juvenile Tyrannosaurus was discovered in the Hell Creek Formation by a crew from the Burpee Museum of Natural History. Dubbed Jane (BMRP 2002.4.1), the find was thought to be the first known skeleton of a pygmy tyrannosaurid, Nanotyrannus, but subsequent research revealed that it is more likely a juvenile Tyrannosaurus, and the most complete juvenile example known; Jane is exhibited at the Burpee Museum of Natural History. In 2002, a skeleton named Wyrex, discovered by amateur collectors Dan Wells and Don Wyrick, had 114 bones and was 38% complete. The dig was concluded over 3 weeks in 2004 by the Black Hills Institute with the first live online Tyrannosaurus excavation providing daily reports, photos, and video.

Footprints

Two isolated fossilized footprints have been tentatively assigned to T. rex. The first was discovered at Philmont Scout Ranch, New Mexico, in 1983 by American geologist Charles Pillmore. Originally thought to belong to a hadrosaurid, examination of the footprint revealed a large 'heel' unknown in ornithopod dinosaur tracks, and traces of what may have been a hallux, the dewclaw-like fourth digit of the tyrannosaur foot. The footprint was published as the ichnogenus Tyrannosauripus pillmorei in 1994, by Martin Lockley and Adrian Hunt. Lockley and Hunt suggested that it was very likely the track was made by a T. rex, which would make it the first known footprint from this species. The track was made in what was once a vegetated wetland mudflat.

A second footprint that may have been made by a Tyrannosaurus was first reported in 2007 by British paleontologist Phil Manning, from the Hell Creek Formation of Montana. Whether or not the track was made by Tyrannosaurus is unclear, though Tyrannosaurus is the only large theropod known to have existed in the Hell Creek Formation.

A set of footprints in Glenrock, Wyoming dating to the Maastrichtian stage of the Late Cretaceous and hailing from the Lance Formation were described by Scott Persons, Phil Currie and colleagues in 2016, and are believed to belong to either a juvenile T. rex or the dubious tyrannosaurid Nanotyrannus lancensis. A follow-up paper appeared in 2017, increasing the speed estimations by 50–80%.

Description

Size

T. rex was one of the largest land carnivores of all time. One of the largest and the most complete specimens, nicknamed Sue (FMNH PR2081), is located at the Field Museum of Natural History in Chicago. A specimen nicknamed Scotty (RSM P2523.8), located at the Royal Saskatchewan Museum, is reported to measure  in length.

Not every adult Tyrannosaurus specimen recovered is as big.

Skull

Large fenestrae (openings) in the skull reduced weight, as in all carnivorous theropods. In other respects Tyrannosaurus's skull was significantly different from those of large non-tyrannosaurid theropods. It was extremely wide at the rear but had a narrow snout, allowing unusually good binocular vision. The skull bones were massive and the nasals and some other bones were fused, preventing movement between them; but many were pneumatized (contained a "honeycomb" of tiny air spaces) and thus lighter. These and other skull-strengthening features are part of the tyrannosaurid trend towards an increasingly powerful bite, which easily surpassed that of all non-tyrannosaurids. The tip of the upper jaw was U-shaped (most non-tyrannosauroid carnivores had V-shaped upper jaws), which increased the amount of tissue and bone a tyrannosaur could rip out with one bite, although it also increased the stresses on the front teeth.

The teeth of T. rex displayed marked heterodonty (differences in shape). The premaxillary teeth, four per side at the front of the upper jaw, were closely packed, D-shaped in cross-section, had reinforcing ridges on the rear surface, were incisiform (their tips were chisel-like blades) and curved backwards. The D-shaped cross-section, reinforcing ridges and backwards curve reduced the risk that the teeth would snap when Tyrannosaurus bit and pulled. The remaining teeth were robust, like "lethal bananas" rather than daggers, more widely spaced and also had reinforcing ridges. Those in the upper jaw, twelve per side in mature individuals, were larger than their counterparts of the lower jaw, except at the rear. The lower jaw was robust. Its front dentary bone bore thirteen teeth. Behind the tooth row, the lower jaw became notably taller. The upper and lower jaws of Tyrannosaurus, like those of many dinosaurs, possessed numerous foramina, or small holes in the bone. Various functions have been proposed for these foramina, such as a crocodile-like sensory system or evidence of extra-oral structures such as scales or potentially lips.

Skeleton

The vertebral column of Tyrannosaurus consisted of ten neck vertebrae, thirteen back vertebrae and five sacral vertebrae. The number of tail vertebrae is unknown and could well have varied between individuals but probably numbered at least forty. Sue was mounted with forty-seven of such caudal vertebrae. The neck of T. rex formed a natural S-shaped curve like that of other theropods. Compared to these, it was exceptionally short, deep and muscular to support the massive head. The second vertebra, the axis, was especially short. The remaining neck vertebrae were weakly opisthocoelous, i.e. with a convex front of the vertebral body and a concave rear. The vertebral bodies had single pleurocoels, pneumatic depressions created by air sacs, on their sides. The vertebral bodies of the torso were robust but with a narrow waist. Their undersides were keeled. The front sides were concave with a deep vertical trough. They had large pleurocoels. Their neural spines had very rough front and rear sides for the attachment of strong tendons. The sacral vertebrae were fused to each other, both in their vertebral bodies and neural spines. They were pneumatized. They were connected to the pelvis by transverse processes and sacral ribs. The tail was heavy and moderately long, in order to balance the massive head and torso and to provide space for massive locomotor muscles that attached to the thighbones. The thirteenth tail vertebra formed the transition point between the deep tail base and the middle tail that was stiffened by a rather long front articulation processes. The underside of the trunk was covered by eighteen or nineteen pairs of segmented belly ribs.

The shoulder girdle was longer than the entire forelimb. The shoulder blade had a narrow shaft but was exceptionally expanded at its upper end. It connected via a long forward protrusion to the coracoid, which was rounded. Both shoulder blades were connected by a small furcula. The paired breast bones possibly were made of cartilage only.

The forelimb or arm was very short. The upper arm bone, the humerus, was short but robust. It had a narrow upper end with an exceptionally rounded head. The lower arm bones, the ulna and radius, were straight elements, much shorter than the humerus. The second metacarpal was longer and wider than the first, whereas normally in theropods the opposite is true. The forelimbs had only two clawed fingers, along with an additional splint-like small third metacarpal representing the remnant of a third digit.

The pelvis was a large structure. Its upper bone, the ilium, was both very long and high, providing an extensive attachment area for hindlimb muscles. The front pubic bone ended in an enormous pubic boot, longer than the entire shaft of the element. The rear ischium was slender and straight, pointing obliquely to behind and below.

In contrast to the arms, the hindlimbs were among the longest in proportion to body size of any theropod. In the foot, the metatarsus was "arctometatarsalian", meaning that the part of the third metatarsal near the ankle was pinched. The third metatarsal was also exceptionally sinuous. Compensating for the immense bulk of the animal, many bones throughout the skeleton were hollowed, reducing its weight without significant loss of strength.

Classification

Tyrannosaurus is the type genus of the superfamily Tyrannosauroidea, the family Tyrannosauridae, and the subfamily Tyrannosaurinae; in other words it is the standard by which paleontologists decide whether to include other species in the same group. Other members of the tyrannosaurine subfamily include the North American Daspletosaurus and the Asian Tarbosaurus, both of which have occasionally been synonymized with Tyrannosaurus. Tyrannosaurids were once commonly thought to be descendants of earlier large theropods such as megalosaurs and carnosaurs, although more recently they were reclassified with the generally smaller coelurosaurs.

Many phylogenetic analyses have found Tarbosaurus bataar to be the sister taxon of T. rex. The discovery of the tyrannosaurid Lythronax further indicates that Tarbosaurus and Tyrannosaurus are closely related, forming a clade with fellow Asian tyrannosaurid Zhuchengtyrannus, with Lythronax being their sister taxon. A further study from 2016 by Steve Brusatte, Thomas Carr and colleagues, also indicates that Tyrannosaurus may have been an immigrant from Asia, as well as a possible descendant of Tarbosaurus.

Below is the cladogram of Tyrannosauridae based on the phylogenetic analysis conducted by Loewen and colleagues in 2013.

Additional species

In 1955, Soviet paleontologist Evgeny Maleev named a new species, Tyrannosaurus bataar, from Mongolia. By 1965, this species was renamed as a distinct genus, Tarbosaurus bataar. While most palaeontologists continue to maintain the two as distinct genera, some authors such as Thomas Holtz, Kenneth Carpenter, and Thomas Carr argue that the two species are similar enough to be considered members of the same genus, with the Mongolian taxon having the resulting binomial of Tyrannosaurus bataar.

In 2001, various tyrannosaurid teeth and a metatarsal unearthed in a quarry near Zhucheng, China were assigned by Chinese paleontologist Hu Chengzhi to the newly erected species Tyrannosaurus zhuchengensis. However, in a nearby site, a right maxilla and left jawbone were assigned to the newly erected tyrannosaurid genus Zhuchengtyrannus in 2011. It is possible that T. zhuchengensis is synonymous with Zhuchengtyrannus. In any case, T. zhuchengensis is considered to be a nomen dubium as the holotype lacks diagnostic features below the level Tyrannosaurinae.

In a 2022 study, Gregory S. Paul and colleagues argued that Tyrannosaurus rex, as traditionally understood, actually represents three species: the type species Tyrannosaurus rex, and two new species: T. imperator (meaning "tyrant lizard emperor") and T. regina (meaning "tyrant lizard queen"). The holotype of the former (T. imperator) is the Sue specimen, and the holotype of the latter (T. regina) is Wankel rex. The division into multiple species was primarily based on the observation of a very high degree of variation in the proportions and robusticity of the femur (and other skeletal elements) across catalogued T. rex specimens, more so than that observed in other theropods recognized as one species. Differences of general body proportions representing robust and gracile morphotypes were also used as a line of evidence, in addition to the number of small, slender incisiform teeth in the dentary, as based on tooth sockets. Specifically, the paper's T. rex was distinguished by robust anatomy, a moderate ratio of femur length vs circumference, and the possession of a singular slender incisiform dentary tooth; T. imperator was considered to be robust with a small femur length to circumference ratio and two of the slender teeth; and T. regina was a gracile form with a high femur ratio and one of the slender teeth. It was observed that variation in proportions and robustness became more extreme higher up in the sample, stratigraphically. This was interpreted as a single earlier population, T. imperator, speciating into more than one taxon, T. rex and T. regina.

However, several other leading paleontologists, including Stephen Brusatte, Thomas Carr, Thomas Holtz, David Hone, Jingmai O'Connor, and Lindsay Zanno, criticized the study or expressed skepticism of its conclusions when approached by various media outlets for comment. Their criticism was subsequently published in a technical paper. Holtz and Zanno both remarked that it was plausible that more than one species of Tyrannosaurus existed, but felt the new study was insufficient to support the species it proposed. Holtz remarked that, even if Tyrannosaurus imperator represented a distinct species from Tyrannosaurus rex, it may represent the same species as Nanotyrannus lancensis and would need to be called Tyrannosaurus lancensis. O'Connor, a curator at the Field Museum, where the T. imperator holotype Sue is displayed, regarded the new species as too poorly-supported to justify modifying the exhibit signs. Brusatte, Carr, and O'Connor viewed the distinguishing features proposed between the species as reflecting natural variation within a species. Both Carr and O'Connor expressed concerns about the study's inability to determine which of the proposed species several well-preserved specimens belonged to. Another paleontologist, Philip J. Currie, originally co-authored the study but withdrew from it as he did not want to be involved in naming the new species. 

Paul rejected the objections raised by critics, insisting that they are unwilling to consider that Tyrannosaurus might represent more than one species. In a subsequent paper awaiting publication, Paul maintained the conclusion that Tyrannosaurus consists of three species. He pointed out that the criticism of the study naming T. imperator and T. regina only focused on two of the features used to distinguish the two new species (the number of small incisiform teeth and femur robustness), while the original study also compared the robustness of other bones as well (the maxilla, dentary, humerus, ilium and metatarsals). Furthermore, Paul argued that Tyrannosaurus can be separated into three different species based on the shape of knob-like bumps (‘postorbital bosses’) behind the eyes. Paul also argued that past research concluding that Tyrannosaurus only consists of one species (T. rex) has simply assumed that all Tyrannosaurus skeletons are a single species, and that many new dinosaur species have been named on the basis of fewer differences than he and his colleagues used when proposing T. imperator and T. regina.

Nanotyrannus

Other tyrannosaurid fossils found in the same formations as T. rex were originally classified as separate taxa, including Aublysodon and Albertosaurus megagracilis, the latter being named Dinotyrannus megagracilis in 1995. These fossils are now universally considered to belong to juvenile T. rex. This skull, CMNH 7541, was originally classified as a species of Gorgosaurus (G. lancensis) by Charles W. Gilmore in 1946. In 1988, the specimen was re-described by Robert T. Bakker, Phil Currie, and Michael Williams, then the curator of paleontology at the Cleveland Museum of Natural History, where the original specimen was housed and is now on display. Their initial research indicated that the skull bones were fused, and that it therefore represented an adult specimen. In light of this, Bakker and colleagues assigned the skull to a new genus named Nanotyrannus (meaning "dwarf tyrant", for its apparently small adult size). However, In 1999, a detailed analysis by Thomas Carr revealed the specimen to be a juvenile, leading Carr and many other paleontologists to consider it a juvenile T. rex individual.

In 2001, a more complete juvenile tyrannosaur (nicknamed "Jane", catalog number BMRP 2002.4.1), belonging to the same species as the original Nanotyrannus specimen, was uncovered. This discovery prompted a conference on tyrannosaurs focused on the issues of Nanotyrannus validity at the Burpee Museum of Natural History in 2005. Several paleontologists who had previously published opinions that N. lancensis was a valid species, including Currie and Williams, saw the discovery of "Jane" as a confirmation that Nanotyrannus was, in fact, a juvenile T. rex. Peter Larson continued to support the hypothesis that N. lancensis was a separate but closely related species, based on skull features such as two more teeth in both jaws than T. rex; as well as proportionately larger hands with phalanges on the third metacarpal and different wishbone anatomy in an undescribed specimen. He also argued that Stygivenator, generally considered to be a juvenile T. rex, may be a younger Nanotyrannus specimen. Later research revealed that other tyrannosaurids such as Gorgosaurus also experienced reduction in tooth count during growth, and given the disparity in tooth count between individuals of the same age group in this genus and Tyrannosaurus, this feature may also be due to individual variation. In 2013, Carr noted that all of the differences claimed to support Nanotyrannus have turned out to be individually or ontogenetically variable features or products of distortion of the bones.

In 2016, analysis of limb proportions by Persons and Currie suggested Nanotyrannus specimens to have differing cursoriality levels, potentially separating it from T. rex. However, paleontologist Manabu Sakomoto has commented that this conclusion may be impacted by low sample size, and the discrepancy does not necessarily reflect taxonomic distinction. In 2016, Joshua Schmerge argued for Nanotyrannus' validity based on skull features, including a dentary groove in BMRP 2002.4.1's skull. According to Schmerge, as that feature is absent in T. rex and found only in Dryptosaurus and albertosaurines, this suggests Nanotyrannus is a distinct taxon within the Albertosaurinae. The same year, Carr and colleagues noted that this was not sufficient enough to clarify Nanotyrannus' validity or classification, being a common and ontogenetically variable feature among tyrannosauroids.

A 2020 study by Holly Woodward and colleagues showed the specimens referred to Nanotyrannus were all ontogenetically immature and found it probable that these specimens belonged to T. rex. The same year, Carr published a paper on T. rex's growth history, finding that CMNH 7541 fit within the expected ontogenetic variation of the taxon and displayed juvenile characteristics found in other specimens. No significant sexual or phylogenetic variation was discernible among any of the 44 specimens studied, with Carr stating that characters of potential phylogenetic importance decrease throughout age at the same rate as growth occurs. Discussing the paper's results, Carr described how all "Nanotyrannus" specimens formed a continual growth transition between the smallest juveniles and the subadults, unlike what would be expected if it were a distinct taxon where the specimens would group to the exclusion of Tyrannosaurus. Carr concluded that "the 'nanomorphs' are not all that similar to each other and instead form an important bridge in the growth series of T. rex that captures the beginnings of the profound change from the shallow skull of juveniles to the deep skull that is seen in fully-developed adults."

Paleobiology

Life history

The identification of several specimens as juvenile T. rex has allowed scientists to document ontogenetic changes in the species, estimate the lifespan, and determine how quickly the animals would have grown. Histologic analysis of T. rex bones showed LACM 28471 had aged only 2 years when it died, while Sue was 28 years old, an age which may have been close to the maximum for the species.

Histology has also allowed the age of other specimens to be determined. Growth curves can be developed when the ages of different specimens are plotted on a graph along with their mass. A T. rex growth curve is S-shaped, with juveniles remaining under  until approximately 14 years of age, when body size began to increase dramatically. During this rapid growth phase, a young T. rex would gain an average of  a year for the next four years. At 18 years of age, the curve plateaus again, indicating that growth slowed dramatically. For example, only  separated the 28-year-old Sue from a 22-year-old Canadian specimen (RTMP 81.12.1). A 2004 histological study performed by different workers corroborates these results, finding that rapid growth began to slow at around 16 years of age.

A study by Hutchinson and colleagues in 2011 corroborated the previous estimation methods in general, but their estimation of peak growth rates is significantly higher; it found that the "maximum growth rates for T. rex during the exponential stage are 1790 kg/year". Although these results were much higher than previous estimations, the authors noted that these results significantly lowered the great difference between its actual growth rate and the one which would be expected of an animal of its size. The sudden change in growth rate at the end of the growth spurt may indicate physical maturity, a hypothesis which is supported by the discovery of medullary tissue in the femur of a 16 to 20-year-old T. rex from Montana (MOR 1125, also known as B-rex). Medullary tissue is found only in female birds during ovulation, indicating that B-rex was of reproductive age. Further study indicates an age of 18 for this specimen. In 2016, it was finally confirmed by Mary Higby Schweitzer and Lindsay Zanno and colleagues that the soft tissue within the femur of MOR 1125 was medullary tissue. This also confirmed the identity of the specimen as a female. The discovery of medullary bone tissue within Tyrannosaurus may prove valuable in determining the sex of other dinosaur species in future examinations, as the chemical makeup of medullary tissue is unmistakable. Other tyrannosaurids exhibit extremely similar growth curves, although with lower growth rates corresponding to their lower adult sizes.

An additional study published in 2020 by Woodward and colleagues, for the journal Science Advances indicates that during their growth from juvenile to adult, Tyrannosaurus was capable of slowing down its growth to counter environmental factors such as lack of food. The study, focusing on two juvenile specimens between 13 and 15 years old housed at the Burpee Museum in Illinois, indicates that the rate of maturation for Tyrannosaurus was dependent on resource abundance. This study also indicates that in such changing environments, Tyrannosaurus was particularly well-suited to an environment that shifted yearly in regards to resource abundance, hinting that other midsize predators might have had difficulty surviving in such harsh conditions and explaining the niche partitioning between juvenile and adult tyrannosaurs. The study further indicates that Tyrannosaurus and the dubious genus Nanotyrannus are synonymous, due to analysis of the growth rings in the bones of the two specimens studied.

Over half of the known T. rex specimens appear to have died within six years of reaching sexual maturity, a pattern which is also seen in other tyrannosaurs and in some large, long-lived birds and mammals today. These species are characterized by high infant mortality rates, followed by relatively low mortality among juveniles. Mortality increases again following sexual maturity, partly due to the stresses of reproduction. One study suggests that the rarity of juvenile T. rex fossils is due in part to low juvenile mortality rates; the animals were not dying in large numbers at these ages, and thus were not often fossilized. This rarity may also be due to the incompleteness of the fossil record or to the bias of fossil collectors towards larger, more spectacular specimens. In a 2013 lecture, Thomas Holtz Jr. suggested that dinosaurs "lived fast and died young" because they reproduced quickly whereas mammals have long life spans because they take longer to reproduce. Gregory S. Paul also writes that Tyrannosaurus reproduced quickly and died young, but attributes their short life spans to the dangerous lives they lived.

Skin and possible filamentous feathering

The discovery of feathered dinosaurs led to debate regarding whether, and to what extent, Tyrannosaurus might have been feathered. Filamentous structures, which are commonly recognized as the precursors of feathers, have been reported in the small-bodied, basal tyrannosauroid Dilong paradoxus from the Early Cretaceous Yixian Formation of China in 2004. Because integumentary impressions of larger tyrannosauroids known at that time showed evidence of scales, the researchers who studied Dilong speculated that insulating feathers might have been lost by larger species due to their smaller surface-to-volume ratio. The subsequent discovery of the giant species Yutyrannus huali, also from the Yixian, showed that even some large tyrannosauroids had feathers covering much of their bodies, casting doubt on the hypothesis that they were a size-related feature. A 2017 study reviewed known skin impressions of tyrannosaurids, including those of a Tyrannosaurus specimen nicknamed "Wyrex" (BHI 6230) which preserves patches of mosaic scales on the tail, hip, and neck. The study concluded that feather covering of large tyrannosaurids such as Tyrannosaurus was, if present, limited to the upper side of the trunk.

A conference abstract published in 2016 posited that theropods such as Tyrannosaurus had their upper teeth covered in lips, instead of bare teeth as seen in crocodilians. This was based on the presence of enamel, which according to the study needs to remain hydrated, an issue not faced by aquatic animals like crocodilians. A 2017 analytical study proposed that tyrannosaurids had large, flat scales on their snouts instead of lips. However, there has been criticism where it favors the idea for lips. Crocodiles do not really have flat scales but rather cracked keratinized skin; by observing the hummocky rugosity of tyrannosaurids, and comparing it to extant lizards they found that tyrannosaurids had squamose scales rather than a crocodillian-like skin.

Sexual dimorphism

As the number of known specimens increased, scientists began to analyze the variation between individuals and discovered what appeared to be two distinct body types, or morphs, similar to some other theropod species. As one of these morphs was more solidly built, it was termed the 'robust' morph while the other was termed 'gracile'. Several morphological differences associated with the two morphs were used to analyze sexual dimorphism in T. rex, with the 'robust' morph usually suggested to be female. For example, the pelvis of several 'robust' specimens seemed to be wider, perhaps to allow the passage of eggs. It was also thought that the 'robust' morphology correlated with a reduced chevron on the first tail vertebra, also ostensibly to allow eggs to pass out of the reproductive tract, as had been erroneously reported for crocodiles.

In recent years, evidence for sexual dimorphism has been weakened. A 2005 study reported that previous claims of sexual dimorphism in crocodile chevron anatomy were in error, casting doubt on the existence of similar dimorphism between T. rex sexes. A full-sized chevron was discovered on the first tail vertebra of Sue, an extremely robust individual, indicating that this feature could not be used to differentiate the two morphs anyway. As T. rex specimens have been found from Saskatchewan to New Mexico, differences between individuals may be indicative of geographic variation rather than sexual dimorphism. The differences could also be age-related, with 'robust' individuals being older animals.

Only a single Tyrannosaurus specimen has been conclusively shown to belong to a specific sex. Examination of B-rex demonstrated the preservation of soft tissue within several bones. Some of this tissue has been identified as a medullary tissue, a specialized tissue grown only in modern birds as a source of calcium for the production of eggshell during ovulation. As only female birds lay eggs, medullary tissue is only found naturally in females, although males are capable of producing it when injected with female reproductive hormones like estrogen. This strongly suggests that B-rex was female and that she died during ovulation. Recent research has shown that medullary tissue is never found in crocodiles, which are thought to be the closest living relatives of dinosaurs, aside from birds. The shared presence of medullary tissue in birds and theropod dinosaurs is further evidence of the close evolutionary relationship between the two.

Posture

Like many bipedal dinosaurs, T. rex was historically depicted as a 'living tripod', with the body at 45 degrees or less from the vertical and the tail dragging along the ground, similar to a kangaroo. This concept dates from Joseph Leidy's 1865 reconstruction of Hadrosaurus, the first to depict a dinosaur in a bipedal posture. In 1915, convinced that the creature stood upright, Henry Fairfield Osborn, former president of the American Museum of Natural History, further reinforced the notion in unveiling the first complete T. rex skeleton arranged this way. It stood in an upright pose for 77 years, until it was dismantled in 1992.

By 1970, scientists realized this pose was incorrect and could not have been maintained by a living animal, as it would have resulted in the dislocation or weakening of several joints, including the hips and the articulation between the head and the spinal column. The inaccurate AMNH mount inspired similar depictions in many films and paintings (such as Rudolph Zallinger's famous mural The Age of Reptiles in Yale University's Peabody Museum of Natural History) until the 1990s, when films such as Jurassic Park introduced a more accurate posture to the general public. Modern representations in museums, art, and film show T. rex with its body approximately parallel to the ground with the tail extended behind the body to balance the head.

To sit down, Tyrannosaurus may have settled its weight backwards and rested its weight on a pubic boot, the wide expansion at the end of the pubis in some dinosaurs. With its weight rested on the pelvis, it may have been free to move the hindlimbs. Getting back up again might have involved some stabilization from the diminutive forelimbs. The latter known as Newman's pushup theory has been debated. Nonetheless, Tyrannosaurus was probably able to get up if it fell, which only would have required placing the limbs below the center of gravity, with the tail as an effective counterbalance. Healed stress fractures in the forelimbs have been put forward both as evidence that the arms cannot have been very useful and as evidence that they were indeed used and acquired wounds, like the rest of the body.

Arms

When T. rex was first discovered, the humerus was the only element of the forelimb known. For the initial mounted skeleton as seen by the public in 1915, Osborn substituted longer, three-fingered forelimbs like those of Allosaurus. A year earlier, Lawrence Lambe described the short, two-fingered forelimbs of the closely related Gorgosaurus. This strongly suggested that T. rex had similar forelimbs, but this hypothesis was not confirmed until the first complete T. rex forelimbs were identified in 1989, belonging to MOR 555 (the "Wankel rex"). The remains of Sue also include complete forelimbs. However, the bones show large areas for muscle attachment, indicating considerable strength. This was recognized as early as 1906 by Osborn, who speculated that the forelimbs may have been used to grasp a mate during copulation. Newman (1970) suggested that the forelimbs were used to assist Tyrannosaurus in rising from a prone position. Since then, other functions have been proposed, although some scholars find them implausible. Padian (2022) argued that the reduction of the arms in tyrannosaurids did not serve a particular function but was a secondary adaptation; stating that as tyrannosaurids developed larger and more powerful skulls and jaws, the arms got smaller to avoid being bitten or torn by other individuals, particularly during group feedings.

Another possibility is that the forelimbs held struggling prey while it was killed by the tyrannosaur's enormous jaws. This hypothesis may be supported by biomechanical analysis. T. rex forelimb bones exhibit extremely thick cortical bone, which has been interpreted as evidence that they were developed to withstand heavy loads. The biceps brachii muscle of an adult T. rex was capable of lifting  by itself; other muscles such as the brachialis would work along with the biceps to make elbow flexion even more powerful. The M. biceps muscle of T. rex was 3.5 times as powerful as the human equivalent. A T. rex forearm had a limited range of motion, with the shoulder and elbow joints allowing only 40 and 45 degrees of motion, respectively. In contrast, the same two joints in Deinonychus allow up to 88 and 130 degrees of motion, respectively, while a human arm can rotate 360 degrees at the shoulder and move through 165 degrees at the elbow. The heavy build of the arm bones, strength of the muscles, and limited range of motion may indicate a system evolved to hold fast despite the stresses of a struggling prey animal. In the first detailed scientific description of Tyrannosaurus forelimbs, paleontologists Kenneth Carpenter and Matt Smith dismissed notions that the forelimbs were useless or that Tyrannosaurus was an obligate scavenger.

The idea that the arms served as weapons when hunting prey have also been proposed by Steven M. Stanley, who suggested that the arms were used for slashing prey, especially by using the claws to rapidly inflict long, deep gashes to its prey. This was  dismissed by Padian, who have argued that Stanley based his conclusion on incorrectly estimated forelimb size and range of motion.

Thermoregulation

Tyrannosaurus, like most dinosaurs, was long thought to have an ectothermic ("cold-blooded") reptilian metabolism. The idea of dinosaur ectothermy was challenged by scientists like Robert T. Bakker and John Ostrom in the early years of the "Dinosaur Renaissance", beginning in the late 1960s. T. rex itself was claimed to have been endothermic ("warm-blooded"), implying a very active lifestyle. Since then, several paleontologists have sought to determine the ability of Tyrannosaurus to regulate its body temperature. Histological evidence of high growth rates in young T. rex, comparable to those of mammals and birds, may support the hypothesis of a high metabolism. Growth curves indicate that, as in mammals and birds, T. rex growth was limited mostly to immature animals, rather than the indeterminate growth seen in most other vertebrates.

Oxygen isotope ratios in fossilized bone are sometimes used to determine the temperature at which the bone was deposited, as the ratio between certain isotopes correlates with temperature. In one specimen, the isotope ratios in bones from different parts of the body indicated a temperature difference of no more than 4 to 5 °C (7 to 9 °F) between the vertebrae of the torso and the tibia of the lower leg. This small temperature range between the body core and the extremities was claimed by paleontologist Reese Barrick and geochemist William Showers to indicate that T. rex maintained a constant internal body temperature (homeothermy) and that it enjoyed a metabolism somewhere between ectothermic reptiles and endothermic mammals. Other scientists have pointed out that the ratio of oxygen isotopes in the fossils today does not necessarily represent the same ratio in the distant past, and may have been altered during or after fossilization (diagenesis). Barrick and Showers have defended their conclusions in subsequent papers, finding similar results in another theropod dinosaur from a different continent and tens of millions of years earlier in time (Giganotosaurus). Ornithischian dinosaurs also showed evidence of homeothermy, while varanid lizards from the same formation did not. In 2022, Wiemann and colleagues used a different approach—the spectroscopy of lipoxidation signals, which are byproducts of oxidative phosphorylation and correlate with metabolic rates—to show that various dinosaur genera including Tyrannosaurus had endothermic metabolisms, on par with that of modern birds and higher than that of mammals. They also suggested that such a metabolism was ancestrally common to all dinosaurs.

Even if T. rex does exhibit evidence of homeothermy, it does not necessarily mean that it was endothermic. Such thermoregulation may also be explained by gigantothermy, as in some living sea turtles. Similar to contemporary crocodilians, openings (dorsotemporal fenestrae) in the skull roofs of Tyrannosaurus may have aided thermoregulation.

Soft tissue

In the March 2005 issue of Science, Mary Higby Schweitzer of North Carolina State University and colleagues announced the recovery of soft tissue from the marrow cavity of a fossilized leg bone from a T. rex. The bone had been intentionally, though reluctantly, broken for shipping and then not preserved in the normal manner, specifically because Schweitzer was hoping to test it for soft tissue. Designated as the Museum of the Rockies specimen 1125, or MOR 1125, the dinosaur was previously excavated from the Hell Creek Formation. Flexible, bifurcating blood vessels and fibrous but elastic bone matrix tissue were recognized. In addition, microstructures resembling blood cells were found inside the matrix and vessels. The structures bear resemblance to ostrich blood cells and vessels. Whether an unknown process, distinct from normal fossilization, preserved the material, or the material is original, the researchers do not know, and they are careful not to make any claims about preservation. If it is found to be original material, any surviving proteins may be used as a means of indirectly guessing some of the DNA content of the dinosaurs involved, because each protein is typically created by a specific gene. The absence of previous finds may be the result of people assuming preserved tissue was impossible, therefore not looking. Since the first, two more tyrannosaurs and a hadrosaur have also been found to have such tissue-like structures. Research on some of the tissues involved has suggested that birds are closer relatives to tyrannosaurs than other modern animals.

In studies reported in Science in April 2007, Asara and colleagues concluded that seven traces of collagen proteins detected in purified T. rex bone most closely match those reported in chickens, followed by frogs and newts. The discovery of proteins from a creature tens of millions of years old, along with similar traces the team found in a mastodon bone at least 160,000 years old, upends the conventional view of fossils and may shift paleontologists' focus from bone hunting to biochemistry. Until these finds, most scientists presumed that fossilization replaced all living tissue with inert minerals. Paleontologist Hans Larsson of McGill University in Montreal, who was not part of the studies, called the finds "a milestone", and suggested that dinosaurs could "enter the field of molecular biology and really slingshot paleontology into the modern world".

The presumed soft tissue was called into question by Thomas Kaye of the University of Washington and his co-authors in 2008. They contend that what was really inside the tyrannosaur bone was slimy biofilm created by bacteria that coated the voids once occupied by blood vessels and cells. The researchers found that what previously had been identified as remnants of blood cells, because of the presence of iron, were actually framboids, microscopic mineral spheres bearing iron. They found similar spheres in a variety of other fossils from various periods, including an ammonite. In the ammonite, they found the spheres in a place where the iron they contain could not have had any relationship to the presence of blood. Schweitzer has strongly criticized Kaye's claims and argues that there is no reported evidence that biofilms can produce branching, hollow tubes like those noted in her study. San Antonio, Schweitzer and colleagues published an analysis in 2011 of what parts of the collagen had been recovered, finding that it was the inner parts of the collagen coil that had been preserved, as would have been expected from a long period of protein degradation. Other research challenges the identification of soft tissue as biofilm and confirms finding "branching, vessel-like structures" from within fossilized bone.

Speed

Tyrannosaurus was a bulky and heavy carnivore so it is unlikely to run very fast at all compared to other theropods like Carnotaurus or Giganotosaurus. Researchers have relied on various estimating techniques because, while there are many tracks of large theropods walking, none showed evidence of running.

A 2002 report used a mathematical model (validated by applying it to three living animals: alligators, chickens, and humans; and eight more species, including emus and ostriches) to gauge the leg muscle mass needed for fast running (over ). Scientists who think that Tyrannosaurus was able to run point out that hollow bones and other features that would have lightened its body may have kept adult weight to a mere  or so, or that other animals like ostriches and horses with long, flexible legs are able to achieve high speeds through slower but longer strides. Proposed top speeds exceeded  for Tyrannosaurus, but were deemed infeasible because they would require exceptional leg muscles of approximately 40–86% of total body mass. Even moderately fast speeds would have required large leg muscles. If the muscle mass was less, only  for walking or jogging would have been possible. Holtz noted that tyrannosaurids and some closely related groups had significantly longer distal hindlimb components (shin plus foot plus toes) relative to the femur length than most other theropods, and that tyrannosaurids and their close relatives had a tightly interlocked metatarsus (foot bones). The third metatarsal was squeezed between the second and fourth metatarsals to form a single unit called an arctometatarsus. This ankle feature may have helped the animal to run more efficiently. Together, these leg features allowed Tyrannosaurus to transmit locomotory forces from the foot to the lower leg more effectively than in earlier theropods.  

Additionally, a 2020 study indicates that Tyrannosaurus and other tyrannosaurids were exceptionally efficient walkers. Studies by Dececchi et al., compared the leg proportions, body mass, and the gaits of more than 70 species of theropod dinosaurs including Tyrannosaurus and its relatives. The research team then applied a variety of methods to estimate each dinosaur's top speed when running as well as how much energy each dinosaur expended while moving at more relaxed speeds such as when walking. Among smaller to medium-sized species such as dromaeosaurids, longer legs appear to be an adaptation for faster running, in line with previous results by other researchers. The results further indicate that smaller theropods evolved long legs as a means to both aid in hunting and escape from larger predators while larger theropods that evolved long legs did so to reduce the energy costs and increase foraging efficiency, as they were freed from the demands of predation pressure due to their role as apex predators. Compared to more basal groups of theropods in the study, tyrannosaurs like Tyrannosaurus itself showed a marked increase in foraging efficiency due to reduced energy expenditures during hunting or scavenging. This in turn likely resulted in tyrannosaurs having a reduced need for hunting forays and requiring less food to sustain themselves as a result. Additionally, the research, in conjunction with studies that show tyrannosaurs were more agile than other large-bodied theropods, indicates they were quite well-adapted to a long-distance stalking approach followed by a quick burst of speed to go for the kill. Analogies can be noted between tyrannosaurids and modern wolves as a result, supported by evidence that at least some tyrannosaurids were hunting in group settings.

While walking, animals reduce their energy expenditure by choosing certain step rhythms at which their body parts resonate. The same would have been true for dinosaurs, but previous studies did not fully account for the impact the tail had on their walking speeds. According to the authors, when a dinosaur walked, its tail would slightly sway up and down with each step as a result of the interspinous ligaments suspending the tail. Like rubber bands, these ligaments stored energy when they are stretched due to the swaying of the tail. Using a 3-D model of Tyrannosaurus specimen Trix, muscles and ligaments were reconstructed to simulate the tail movements. This results in a rhythmic, energy-efficient walking speed for Tyrannosaurus similar to that seen in living animals such as humans, ostriches and giraffes.

A 2017 study estimated the top running speed of Tyrannosaurus as 17 mph (27 km/h), speculating that Tyrannosaurus exhausted its energy reserves long before reaching top speed, resulting in a parabola-like relationship between size and speed. Another 2017 study hypothesized that an adult Tyrannosaurus was incapable of running due to high skeletal loads. Using a calculated weight estimate of 7 tons, the model showed that speeds above 11 mph (18 km/h) would have probably shattered the leg bones of Tyrannosaurus. The finding may mean that running was also not possible for other giant theropod dinosaurs like Giganotosaurus, Mapusaurus and Acrocanthosaurus.
However, studies by Eric Snively and colleagues, published in 2019 indicate that Tyrannosaurus and other tyrannosaurids were more maneuverable than allosauroids and other theropods of comparable size due to low rotational inertia compared to their body mass combined with large leg muscles. As a result, it is hypothesized that Tyrannosaurus was capable of making relatively quick turns and could likely pivot its body more quickly when close to its prey, or that while turning, the theropod could "pirouette" on a single planted foot while the alternating leg was held out in a suspended swing during a pursuit. The results of this study potentially could shed light on how agility could have contributed to the success of tyrannosaurid evolution.

Possible footprints

Rare fossil footprints and trackways found in New Mexico and Wyoming that are assigned to the ichnogenus Tyrannosauripus have been attributed to being made by Tyrannosaurus, based on the stratigraphic age of the rocks they are preserved in. The first specimen, found in 1994 was described by Lockley and Hunt and consists of a single, large footprint. Another pair of ichnofossils, described in 2021, show a large tyrannosaurid rising from a prone position by rising up using its elbows in conjunction with the pads on their feet to stand. These two unique sets of fossils were found in Ludlow, Colorado and Cimarron, New Mexico. Another ichnofossil described in 2018, perhaps belonging to a juvenile Tyrannosaurus or the dubious genus Nanotyrannus was uncovered in the Lance Formation of Wyoming.

Brain and senses 

A study conducted by Lawrence Witmer and Ryan Ridgely of Ohio University found that Tyrannosaurus shared the heightened sensory abilities of other coelurosaurs, highlighting relatively rapid and coordinated eye and head movements; an enhanced ability to sense low frequency sounds, which would allow tyrannosaurs to track prey movements from long distances; and an enhanced sense of smell. A study published by Kent Stevens concluded that Tyrannosaurus had keen vision. By applying modified perimetry to facial reconstructions of several dinosaurs including Tyrannosaurus, the study found that Tyrannosaurus had a binocular range of 55 degrees, surpassing that of modern hawks. Stevens estimated that Tyrannosaurus had 13 times the visual acuity of a human and surpassed the visual acuity of an eagle, which is 3.6 times that of a person.

Thomas Holtz Jr. would note that high depth perception of Tyrannosaurus may have been due to the prey it had to hunt, noting that it had to hunt horned dinosaurs such as Triceratops, armored dinosaurs such as Ankylosaurus, and the duck-billed dinosaurs and their possibly complex social behaviors. He would suggest that this made precision more crucial for Tyrannosaurus enabling it to, "get in, get that blow in and take it down." In contrast, Acrocanthosaurus had limited depth perception because they hunted large sauropods, which were relatively rare during the time of Tyrannosaurus.

Tyrannosaurus had very large olfactory bulbs and olfactory nerves relative to their brain size, the organs responsible for a heightened sense of smell. This suggests that the sense of smell was highly developed, and implies that tyrannosaurs could detect carcasses by scent alone across great distances. The sense of smell in tyrannosaurs may have been comparable to modern vultures, which use scent to track carcasses for scavenging. Research on the olfactory bulbs has shown that T. rex had the most highly developed sense of smell of 21 sampled non-avian dinosaur species.

Somewhat unusually among theropods, T. rex had a very long cochlea. The length of the cochlea is often related to hearing acuity, or at least the importance of hearing in behavior, implying that hearing was a particularly important sense to tyrannosaurs. Specifically, data suggests that T. rex heard best in the low-frequency range, and that low-frequency sounds were an important part of tyrannosaur behavior. A 2017 study by Thomas Carr and colleagues found that the snout of tyrannosaurids was highly sensitive, based on a high number of small openings in the facial bones of the related Daspletosaurus that contained sensory neurons. The study speculated that tyrannosaurs might have used their sensitive snouts to measure the temperature of their nests and to gently pick up eggs and hatchlings, as seen in modern crocodylians. 
Another study published in 2021 further suggests that Tyrannosaurus had an acute sense of touch, based on neurovascular canals in the front of its jaws, which it could utilize to better detect and consume prey. The study, published by Kawabe and Hittori et al., suggests that Tyrannosaurus could also accurately sense slight differences in material and movement, allowing it to utilize different feeding strategies on different parts of its prey's carcasses depending on the situation. The sensitive neurovascular canals of Tyrannosaurus also likely were adapted to performing fine movements and behaviors such as nest building, parental care, and other social behavior such as intraspecific communication. The results of this study also align with results made in studying the related tyrannosaurid Daspletosaurus horneri and the allosauroid Neovenator, which have similar neurovascular adaptations, suggesting that the faces of theropods were highly sensitive to pressure and touch. However, a more recent study reviewing the evolution of the trigeminal canals among sauropsids notes that a much denser network of neurovascular canals in the snout and lower jaw is more commonly encountered in aquatic or semiaquatic taxa (e.g., Spinosaurus, Halszkaraptor, Plesiosaurus), and taxa that developed a rhamphotheca (e.g., Caenagnathasia), while the network of canals in Tyrannosaurus appears simpler, though still more derived than in most ornithischians, and overall  
terrestrial taxa such as tyrannosaurids and Neovenator may have had average facial sensitivity for non-edentulous terrestrial theropods, although further research is needed. The neurovascular canals in Tyrannosaurus may instead have supported soft tissue structures for thermoregulation or social signaling, the latter of which could be confirmed by the fact that the neurovascular network of canals may have changed during ontogeny.

A study by Grant R. Hurlburt, Ryan C. Ridgely and Lawrence Witmer obtained estimates for Encephalization Quotients (EQs), based on reptiles and birds, as well as estimates for the ratio of cerebrum to brain mass. The study concluded that Tyrannosaurus had the relatively largest brain of all adult non-avian dinosaurs with the exception of certain small maniraptoriforms (Bambiraptor, Troodon and Ornithomimus). The study found that Tyrannosaurus'''s relative brain size was still within the range of modern reptiles, being at most 2 standard deviations above the mean of non-avian reptile EQs. The estimates for the ratio of cerebrum mass to brain mass would range from 47.5 to 49.53 percent. According to the study, this is more than the lowest estimates for extant birds (44.6 percent), but still close to the typical ratios of the smallest sexually mature alligators which range from 45.9–47.9 percent. Other studies, such as those by Steve Brusatte, indicate the encephalization quotient of Tyrannosaurus was similar in range (2.0–2.4) to a chimpanzee (2.2–2.5), though this may be debatable as reptilian and mammalian encephalization quotients are not equivalent.

 Social behavior 

Philip J. Currie suggested that Tyrannosaurus may have been pack hunters, comparing T. rex to related species Tarbosaurus bataar and Albertosaurus sarcophagus, citing fossil evidence that may indicate gregarious (describing animals that travel in herds or packs) behavior. A find in South Dakota where three T. rex skeletons were in close proximity may suggest the formation of a pack. Cooperative pack hunting may have been an effective strategy for subduing prey with advanced anti-predator adaptations which pose potential lethality such as Triceratops and Ankylosaurus.

Currie's pack-hunting T. rex hypothesis has been criticized for not having been peer-reviewed, but rather was discussed in a television interview and book called Dino Gangs. The Currie theory for pack hunting by T. rex is based mainly by analogy to a different species, Tarbosaurus bataar. Evidence of gregariousness in T. bataar itself has not been peer-reviewed, and to Currie's own admission, can only be interpreted with reference to evidence in other closely related species. According to Currie gregariousness in Albertosaurus sarcophagus is supported by the discovery of 26 individuals with varied ages in the Dry Island bonebed. He ruled out the possibility of a predator trap due to the similar preservation state of individuals and the near absence of herbivores. (not printed until 2000)

Additional support of Tyrannosaurid gregariousness can be found in fossilized trackways from the Upper Cretaceous Wapiti Formation of northeastern British Columbia, Canada, left by three tyrannosaurids traveling in the same direction. According to scientists assessing the Dino Gangs program, the evidence for pack hunting in Tarbosaurus and Albertosaurus is weak and based on group skeletal remains for which alternate explanations may apply (such as drought or a flood forcing dinosaurs to die together in one place). Others researchers have speculated that instead of large theropod social groups, some of these finds represent behavior more akin to Komodo dragon-like mobbing of carcasses, even going as far as to say true pack-hunting behavior may not exist in any non-avian dinosaurs due to its rarity in modern predators.

Evidence of intraspecific attack was found by Joseph Peterson and his colleagues in the juvenile Tyrannosaurus nicknamed Jane. Peterson and his team found that Jane's skull showed healed puncture wounds on the upper jaw and snout which they believe came from another juvenile Tyrannosaurus. Subsequent CT scans of Jane's skull would further confirm the team's hypothesis, showing that the puncture wounds came from a traumatic injury and that there was subsequent healing. The team would also state that Jane's injuries were structurally different from the parasite-induced lesions found in Sue and that Jane's injuries were on her face whereas the parasite that infected Sue caused lesions to the lower jaw.

Feeding strategies

Most paleontologists accept that Tyrannosaurus was both an active predator and a scavenger like most large carnivores. By far the largest carnivore in its environment, T. rex was most likely an apex predator, preying upon hadrosaurs, armored herbivores like ceratopsians and ankylosaurs, and possibly sauropods. A study in 2012 by Karl Bates and Peter Falkingham found that Tyrannosaurus had the most powerful bite of any terrestrial animal that has ever lived, finding an adult Tyrannosaurus could have exerted 35,000 to 57,000 N (7,868 to 12,814 lbf) of force in the back teeth. Even higher estimates were made by Mason B. Meers in 2003. This allowed it to crush bones during repetitive biting and fully consume the carcasses of large dinosaurs. Stephan Lautenschlager and colleagues calculated that Tyrannosaurus was capable of a maximum jaw gape of around 80 degrees, a necessary adaptation for a wide range of jaw angles to power the creature's strong bite.

A debate exists, however, about whether Tyrannosaurus was primarily a predator or a pure scavenger. The debate originated in a 1917 study by Lambe which argued that large theropods were pure scavengers because Gorgosaurus teeth showed hardly any wear. This argument disregarded the fact that theropods replaced their teeth quite rapidly. Ever since the first discovery of Tyrannosaurus most scientists have speculated that it was a predator; like modern large predators it would readily scavenge or steal another predator's kill if it had the opportunity.

Paleontologist Jack Horner has been a major proponent of the view that Tyrannosaurus was not a predator at all but instead was exclusively a scavenger. He has put forward arguments in the popular literature to support the pure scavenger hypothesis:

 Tyrannosaur arms are short when compared to other known predators. Horner argues that the arms were too short to make the necessary gripping force to hold on to prey. Other paleontologists such as Thomas Holtz Jr. argued that there are plenty of modern-day predators that do not use their forelimbs to hunt such as wolves, hyenas, and secretary birds as well as other extinct animals thought to be predators that would not have used their forelimbs such as Phorusrhacids.
 Tyrannosaurs had large olfactory bulbs and olfactory nerves (relative to their brain size). These suggest a highly developed sense of smell which could sniff out carcasses over great distances, as modern vultures do. Research on the olfactory bulbs of dinosaurs has shown that Tyrannosaurus had the most highly developed sense of smell of 21 sampled dinosaurs.
 Tyrannosaur teeth could crush bone, and therefore could extract as much food (bone marrow) as possible from carcass remnants, usually the least nutritious parts. Karen Chin and colleagues have found bone fragments in coprolites (fossilized feces) that they attribute to tyrannosaurs, but point out that a tyrannosaur's teeth were not well adapted to systematically chewing bone like hyenas do to extract marrow.
 Since at least some of Tyrannosauruss potential prey could move quickly, evidence that it walked instead of ran could indicate that it was a scavenger. On the other hand, recent analyses suggest that Tyrannosaurus, while slower than large modern terrestrial predators, may well have been fast enough to prey on large hadrosaurs and ceratopsians.

Other evidence suggests hunting behavior in Tyrannosaurus. The eye sockets of tyrannosaurs are positioned so that the eyes would point forward, giving them binocular vision slightly better than that of modern hawks. It is not obvious why natural selection would have favored this long-term trend if tyrannosaurs had been pure scavengers, which would not have needed the advanced depth perception that stereoscopic vision provides. In modern animals, binocular vision is found mainly in predators.

A 2021 study focused on the vision and hearing of the small theropod Shuvuuia, to which Tyrannosaurus was compared suggests that Tyrannosaurus was diurnal and would have hunted predominantly during daylight hours, a feature it shared with Dromaeosaurus, a third dinosaur compared to Shuvuuia in the study. 

A skeleton of the hadrosaurid Edmontosaurus annectens has been described from Montana with healed tyrannosaur-inflicted damage on its tail vertebrae. The fact that the damage seems to have healed suggests that the Edmontosaurus survived a tyrannosaur's attack on a living target, i.e. the tyrannosaur had attempted active predation. Despite the consensus that the tail bites were caused by Tyrannosaurus, there has been some evidence to show that they might have been created by other factors. For example, a 2014 study suggested that the tail injuries might have been due to Edmontosaurus individuals stepping on each other, while another study in 2020 backs up the hypothesis that biomechanical stress is the cause for the tail injuries. There is also evidence for an aggressive interaction between a Triceratops and a Tyrannosaurus in the form of partially healed tyrannosaur tooth marks on a Triceratops brow horn and squamosal (a bone of the neck frill); the bitten horn is also broken, with new bone growth after the break. It is not known what the exact nature of the interaction was, though: either animal could have been the aggressor. Since the Triceratops wounds healed, it is most likely that the Triceratops survived the encounter and managed to overcome the Tyrannosaurus. In a battle against a bull Triceratops, the Triceratops would likely defend itself by inflicting fatal wounds to the Tyrannosaurus using its sharp horns. Studies of Sue found a broken and healed fibula and tail vertebrae, scarred facial bones and a tooth from another Tyrannosaurus embedded in a neck vertebra, providing evidence for aggressive behavior. Studies on hadrosaur vertebrae from the Hell Creek Formation that were punctured by the teeth of what appears to be a late-stage juvenile Tyrannosaurus indicate that despite lacking the bone-crushing adaptations of the adults, young individuals were still capable of using the same bone-puncturing feeding technique as their adult counterparts.Tyrannosaurus may have had infectious saliva used to kill its prey, as proposed by William Abler in 1992. These chambers might have trapped pieces of carcass with bacteria, giving Tyrannosaurus a deadly, infectious bite much like the Komodo dragon was thought to have. Jack Horner and Don Lessem, in a 1993 popular book, questioned Abler's hypothesis, arguing that Tyrannosauruss tooth serrations as more like cubes in shape than the serrations on a Komodo monitor's teeth, which are rounded.Tyrannosaurus, and most other theropods, probably primarily processed carcasses with lateral shakes of the head, like crocodilians. The head was not as maneuverable as the skulls of allosauroids, due to flat joints of the neck vertebrae.

Cannibalism
Evidence also strongly suggests that tyrannosaurs were at least occasionally cannibalistic. Tyrannosaurus itself has strong evidence pointing towards it having been cannibalistic in at least a scavenging capacity based on tooth marks on the foot bones, humerus, and metatarsals of one specimen. Fossils from the Fruitland Formation, Kirtland Formation (both Campanian in age) and the Maastrichtian aged Ojo Alamo Formation suggest that cannibalism was present in various tyrannosaurid genera of the San Juan Basin. The evidence gathered from the specimens suggests opportunistic feeding behavior in tyrannosaurids that cannibalized members of their own species. A study from Currie, Horner, Erickson and Longrich in 2010 has been put forward as evidence of cannibalism in the genus Tyrannosaurus. They studied some Tyrannosaurus specimens with tooth marks in the bones, attributable to the same genus. The tooth marks were identified in the humerus, foot bones and metatarsals, and this was seen as evidence for opportunistic scavenging, rather than wounds caused by intraspecific combat. In a fight, they proposed it would be difficult to reach down to bite in the feet of a rival, making it more likely that the bitemarks were made in a carcass. As the bitemarks were made in body parts with relatively scantly amounts of flesh, it is suggested that the Tyrannosaurus was feeding on a cadaver in which the more fleshy parts already had been consumed. They were also open to the possibility that other tyrannosaurids practiced cannibalism.

 Parenting 
While there is no direct evidence of Tyrannosaurus raising their young (the rarity of juvenile and nest Tyrannosaur fossils has left researchers guessing), it has been suggested by some that like its closest living relatives, modern archosaurs (birds and crocodiles) Tyrannosaurus may have protected and fed its young. Crocodilians and birds are often suggested by some paleontologists to be modern analogues for dinosaur parenting. Direct evidence of parental behavior exists in other dinosaurs such as Maiasaura peeblesorum, the first dinosaur to have been discovered to raise its young, as well as more closely related Oviraptorids, the latter suggesting parental behavior in theropods.

Pathology

In 2001, Bruce Rothschild and others published a study examining evidence for stress fractures and tendon avulsions in theropod dinosaurs and the implications for their behavior. Since stress fractures are caused by repeated trauma rather than singular events they are more likely to be caused by regular behavior than other types of injuries. Of the 81 Tyrannosaurus foot bones examined in the study, one was found to have a stress fracture, while none of the 10 hand bones were found to have stress fractures. The researchers found tendon avulsions only among Tyrannosaurus and Allosaurus. An avulsion injury left a divot on the humerus of Sue the T. rex, apparently located at the origin of the deltoid or teres major muscles. The presence of avulsion injuries being limited to the forelimb and shoulder in both Tyrannosaurus and Allosaurus suggests that theropods may have had a musculature more complex than and functionally different from those of birds. The researchers concluded that Sue's tendon avulsion was probably obtained from struggling prey. The presence of stress fractures and tendon avulsions, in general, provides evidence for a "very active" predation-based diet rather than obligate scavenging.

A 2009 study showed that smooth-edged holes in the skulls of several specimens might have been caused by Trichomonas-like parasites that commonly infect birds. According to the study, seriously infected individuals, including "Sue" and MOR 980 ("Peck's Rex"), might therefore have died from starvation after feeding became increasingly difficult. Previously, these holes had been explained by the bacterious bone infection Actinomycosis or by intraspecific attacks. A subsequent study found that while trichomoniasis has many attributes of the model proposed (osteolytic, intra oral) several features make the assumption that it was the cause of death less supportable by evidence. For example, the observed sharp margins with little reactive bone shown by the radiographs of Trichomonas-infected birds are dissimilar to the reactive bone seen in the affected T. rex specimens. Also, trichomoniasis can be very rapidly fatal in birds (14 days or less) albeit in its milder form, and this suggests that if a Trichomonas-like protozoan is the culprit, trichomoniasis was less acute in its non-avian dinosaur form during the Late Cretaceous. Finally, the relative size of this type of lesions is much larger in small bird throats, and may not have been enough to choke a T. rex. A more recent study examining the pathologies concluded that the osseous alteration observed most closely resembles those around healing human cranial trepanations and healing fractures in the Triassic reptile Stagonolepis, in the absence of infection. The possible cause may instead have been intraspecific combat.

One study of Tyrannosaurus specimens with tooth marks in the bones attributable to the same genus was presented as evidence of cannibalism. Tooth marks in the humerus, foot bones and metatarsals, may indicate opportunistic scavenging, rather than wounds caused by combat with another T. rex. Other tyrannosaurids may also have practiced cannibalism.

PaleoecologyTyrannosaurus lived during what is referred to as the Lancian faunal stage (Maastrichtian age) at the end of the Late Cretaceous. Tyrannosaurus ranged from Canada in the north to at least New Mexico in the south of Laramidia. During this time Triceratops was the major herbivore in the northern portion of its range, while the titanosaurian sauropod Alamosaurus "dominated" its southern range. Tyrannosaurus remains have been discovered in different ecosystems, including inland and coastal subtropical, and semi-arid plains.

Several notable Tyrannosaurus remains have been found in the Hell Creek Formation. During the Maastrichtian this area was subtropical, with a warm and humid climate. The flora consisted mostly of angiosperms, but also included trees like dawn redwood (Metasequoia) and Araucaria. Tyrannosaurus shared this ecosystem with ceratopsians Leptoceratops, Torosaurus, and Triceratops, the hadrosaurid Edmontosaurus annectens, the parksosaurid Thescelosaurus, the ankylosaurs Ankylosaurus and Denversaurus, the pachycephalosaurs Pachycephalosaurus and Sphaerotholus, and the theropods Ornithomimus, Struthiomimus, Acheroraptor, Dakotaraptor, Pectinodon and Anzu.

Another formation with Tyrannosaurus remains is the Lance Formation of Wyoming. This has been interpreted as a bayou environment similar to today's Gulf Coast. The fauna was very similar to Hell Creek, but with Struthiomimus replacing its relative Ornithomimus. The small ceratopsian Leptoceratops also lived in the area.

In its southern range Tyrannosaurus lived alongside the titanosaur Alamosaurus, the ceratopsians Torosaurus, Bravoceratops and Ojoceratops, hadrosaurs which consisted of a species of Edmontosaurus, Kritosaurus and a possible species of Gryposaurus, the nodosaur Glyptodontopelta, the oviraptorid Ojoraptosaurus, possible species of the theropods Troodon and Richardoestesia, and the pterosaur Quetzalcoatlus. The region is thought to have been dominated by semi-arid inland plains, following the probable retreat of the Western Interior Seaway as global sea levels fell.Tyrannosaurus may have also inhabited Mexico's Lomas Coloradas formation in Sonora. Though skeletal evidence is lacking, six shed and broken teeth from the fossil bed have been thoroughly compared with other theropod genera and appear to be identical to those of Tyrannosaurus. If true, the evidence indicates the range of Tyrannosaurus was possibly more extensive than previously believed. It is possible that tyrannosaurs were originally Asian species, migrating to North America before the end of the Cretaceous period.

Population estimates

According to studies published in 2021 by Charles Marshall et al., the total population of adult Tyrannosaurus at any given time was perhaps 20,000 individuals, with computer estimations also suggesting a total population no lower than 1,300 and no higher than 328,000. The authors themselves suggest that the estimate of 20,000 individuals is probably lower than what should be expected, especially when factoring in that disease pandemics could easily wipe out such a small population. Over the span of the genus' existence, it is estimated that there were about 127,000 generations and that this added up to a total of roughly 2.5 billion animals until their extinction.

In the same paper, it is suggested that in a population of Tyrannosaurus adults numbering 20,000, the number of individuals living in an area the size of California could be as high as 3,800 animals, while an area the size of Washington D.C. could support a population of only two adult Tyrannosaurus. The study does not take into account the number of juvenile animals in the genus present in this population estimate due to their occupation of a different niche than the adults, and thus it is likely the total population was much higher when accounting for this factor. Simultaneously, studies of living carnivores suggest that some predator populations are higher in density than others of similar weight (such as jaguars and hyenas, which are similar in weight but have vastly differing population densities). Lastly, the study suggests that in most cases, only one in 80 million Tyrannosaurus would become fossilized, while the chances were likely as high as one in every 16,000 of an individual becoming fossilized in areas that had more dense populations.

Meiri (2022) questioned the reliability of the estimates, citing uncertainty in metabolic rate, body size, sex and age-specific survival rates, habitat requirements and range size variability as shortcomings Marshall et al. didn't take into account. The authors of the original publication replied that while they agree that their reported uncertainties were probably too small, their framework is flexible enough to accommodate uncerainty in physiology, and that their calculations do not depend on short-term changes in population density and geographic range, but rather on their long-term averages. Finally, they remark that they did estimate the range of reasonable survivorship curves and that they did include uncertainty in the time of onset of sexual maturity and in the growth curve by incorporating the
uncertainty in the maximum body mass.

Cultural significance

Since it was first described in 1905, T. rex has become the most widely recognized dinosaur species in popular culture. It is the only dinosaur that is commonly known to the general public by its full scientific name (binomial name) and the scientific abbreviation T. rex has also come into wide usage. Robert T. Bakker notes this in The Dinosaur Heresies and explains that, "a name like T. rex'' is just irresistible to the tongue."

See also 

 History of paleontology
 Sue (dinosaur) (FMNH-PR-2081)
 Tyrannosauridae

Explanatory notes

References

Further reading

External links

 The University of Edinburgh Lecture Dr Stephen Brusatte – Tyrannosaur Discoveries Feb 20, 2015
 28 species in the tyrannosaur family tree, when and where they lived Stephen Brusatte Thomas Carr 2016
 Australia's answer to T-Rex, State Library of Queensland

Exhibits
 American Museum of Natural History

 
1900s neologisms
Apex predators
Fossil taxa described in 1905
Hell Creek fauna
Lance fauna
Laramie Formation
Late Cretaceous dinosaurs of North America
Maastrichtian genus extinctions
Maastrichtian genus first appearances
Maastrichtian life
Paleontology in Colorado
Paleontology in Montana
Paleontology in South Dakota
Paleontology in Wyoming
Scollard fauna
Taxa named by Henry Fairfield Osborn
Tyrannosaurids